Samson Kambalu (born 1975) is a Malawi-born artist, academic  and author who trained as a fine artist and ethnomusicologist at the University of Malawi's Chancellor College. He is a Fellow of Magdalen College, Oxford.

Life and work 
Kambalu was born in Malawi, where he attended Kamuzu Academy, the "Eton of Africa". He graduated from the University of Malawi's Chancellor College, Zomba in 1999.  Kambalu completed his MA in Fine Art at Nottingham Trent University in 2003 and wrote his PhD at Chelsea College of Art and Design, looking at how the problematic of the gift and the general economy animates various aspects of his art practice.

Kambalu's work, which references Situationism and the Chewa Nyau culture of his native Malawi, manifests in various media, from drawing, painting, installation, video to literature and performance.

One of his most well known artworks is Holy Ball, a football plastered in pages of the Bible. Kambalu held an exhibition of 24 "Holy Balls" at Chancellor College in 2000 at which he invited the visitors to “exercise and exorcise”. He has since shown his work internationally. In 2015 he was included in Okwui Enwezor's All the World's Futures at the 56th Venice Biennale. In November 2015 a judge in Venice dismissed a complaint filed by the Italian situationist Gianfranco Sanguinetti against the Venice Biennale and Kambalu with regard to the unauthorised and wholescale appropriation of Sanguinetti's entire archive for one of Kambalu's installations, Sanguinetti Breakout Area.

Kambalu's Nyau Cinema is a series of short film clips of psychogeographical performances, shared as interventions on social networking sites and as installations in galleries. These have been described as "cinematic fragments that blend slapstick and spiritual ritual".

His first book, an autobiographical narrative entitled The Jive Talker or How to Get a British Passport, was published by Jonathan Cape (Random House) in July 2008, and in August 2008 by Free Press (Simon & Schuster). His second novel, Uccello's Vineyard, published in 2012, is in The Book Lovers, a collection of artist novels at the Museum of Contemporary Art in Antwerp.

Kambalu is represented by Kate MacGarry in London and Galerie Nordenhake in Stockholm.

On 5 July 2021, it was announced that Kambalu's artwork had been selected as the next to occupy the Fourth plinth in Trafalgar Square in central London from September 2022 until 2024. The sculpture, entitled Antelope, restages a 1914 photograph of Baptist preacher and pan-Africanist John Chilembwe and European missionary John Chorley. Chilembwe wears a hat in an act of defiance, as it was illegal at the time for an African to wear a hat in front of a white person.

Exhibitions

Selected solo exhibitions 
 2017 – Red Barn Farm, Galerie Nordenhake, Stockholm, Sweden   
 2015 – The Unbearable Lightness of Nyau Cinema, Gallery U Mloka, Olomouc, Czech Republic
 2015 – Double Feature: Nyau Cinema, Schirn Kunsthalle, Frankfurt, Germany
 2014 – Sepia Rain, Stevenson Johannesburg, South Africa
 2012 – Tattoo City: The First Three Chapters (with guests), Castlefield Gallery, Manchester, UK
 2000 – Holyball Exercises and Exorcisms, Chancellor College, Zomba, Malawi

Selected group exhibitions 
 2016 – Liverpool Biennial, Liverpool, UK
 2016 – Dakar Biennale, Dakar, Senegal
 2016 – Lost & Found, Paradiso, Amsterdam, The Netherlands
 2015 –  Embodied, Nikolaj Kunsthal, Copenhagen, Denmark
 2015 – 50/50, New Church Museum, Cape Town, South Africa
 2015 – Transformation Marathon, Serpentine Galleries, London
 2015 – Schema, Stevenson Cape Town, South Africa
 2015 – All The World's Futures, Venice Biennale, Italy
 2014 – Chroma, Stevenson Cape Town, South Africa
 2014 – Dakar Biennale, Dakar, Senegal
 2004 – Bloomberg New Contemporaries, Liverpool, UK

Bibliography

Books 
 2012 – Uccello's Vineyard. ASIN: B009Z48N2Y
 2008 – The Jive Talker or, How to Get a British Passport.

Articles 
 2015, Entering the Arena: All the World's Futures, Art in Culture, South Korea, and Contemporary And
 2014, Great African Minds: Dr Charles Chanthunya, Peter Hammer Verlag
 2013, The Museum and the Individual, essay on Meschac Gaba's Museum of Contemporary African Art, Tate Modern
 2011, Der skurrile Diktator, Kulturaustausch, IFA, Germany
 2010, Dr Albert Schweitzer's Troublesome Young Brother, Kulturaustausch, IFA, Germany
 2010, Windmill Jive, Salz Magazine, Austria
 2009, Action Bitte – Malawians at Leisure, Kulturaustausch, IFA, Germany

Residencies, fellowships and awards 
 2015, Research fellowship, Smithsonian Institution National Museum of African Art, Washington DC, USA
 2014, Research fellowship, Yale Center for British Art, New Haven, USA
 2013, AHRC PhD Research Award, UK
 2005–10, The Fire Station Residency, ACME, London, UK
 2004, Decibel Visual Arts Award, Arts Council
 2000, Thami Mnyele Artist Residency, Amsterdam, The Netherlands

Notes and references

External links 
 
 Kate MacGarry: Samson Kambalu
 Random House
 Simon & Schuster
 Contemporary And: Samson Kambalu
 Giles Foden, "Good news from Africa", review of The Jive Talker, The Guardian, 23 August 2008.
 Susan Williams, "The Jive Talker, by Samson Kambalu – Portrait of the artist as a young African" (review), The Independent, 4 July 2008.
 Aminatta Forna, "Review: The Jive Talker by Samson Kambalu", The Telegraph, 10 August 2008.
 Massa Lemu, "For the ranter, the whole world is a playground. In conversation with Samson Kambalu", Contemporary And, 13 February 2014.

1975 births
British artists
Black British artists
British conceptual artists
Fellows of Magdalen College, Oxford
Malawian artists
Malawian writers
Living people
University of Malawi alumni
Alumni of Nottingham Trent University
Alumni of Kamuzu Academy
21st-century male artists